Knox County is a county located in Appalachia near the southeastern corner of the U.S. state of Kentucky. As of the 2020 census, the population was 30,193. Its county seat is Barbourville. The county is named for General Henry Knox. It is one of the few coal-producing counties in Kentucky that has not suffered massive population loss. Knox County is included in the London, KY Micropolitan Statistical Area.

History
Knox County was formed on December 19, 1799, from portions of Lincoln County. It is usually assumed to be named for Henry Knox of Massachusetts, a Revolutionary War general and the first United States Secretary of War. However, there is strong evidence that it was actually named for James Knox. Knox was a pre-war explorer and long hunter, a veteran of Dunmore's War and the Revolutionary War, a pioneer guide, road-builder, and legislator. Knox had used the Wilderness Road, which traverses the county, as an explorer and later oversaw its improvement into a wagon road.

The Civil War Battle of Barbourville was fought on September 19, 1861, between 800 Confederate soldiers from General Felix Zollicoffer's command and 300 Union troops who attempted to defend the Union's Camp Andrew Johnson. The Union men tore up the planks on the bridge in an attempt to keep the Confederates from crossing, but the more numerous Confederates succeeded anyway. They destroyed the camp and seized the arms and equipment it contained.

The present courthouse, completed in 1964, is the fifth courthouse to serve the county.

The county has historically had coal mining as the driver of its economy. Unlike other areas of southeastern Kentucky, it has continued to maintain jobs and much of its population.

Geography

Adjacent counties
 Clay County  (northeast)
 Bell County  (southeast)
 Whitley County  (southwest)
 Laurel County  (northwest)

Economy
The largest employers in Knox County are Health Care & Social Assistance (1,406 people), Retail Trade (1,331 people), and Educational Services (1,226 people). But the highest-paying jobs are with mining, quarrying, and oil and gas extraction. Real estate sales, and rental and leasing also pay well, followed by finance and insurance.

Demographics

As of the census of 2000, there were 31,795 people, 12,416 households, and 8,939 families residing in the county. The racial makeup of the county was 97.84% White, 0.82% Black or African American, 0.25% Native American, 0.17% Asian, 0.02% Pacific Islander, 0.08% from other races, and 0.82% from two or more races.  0.57% of the population were Hispanic or Latino of any race.

There were 12,416 households, out of which 34.40% had children under the age of 18 living with them, 54.30% were married couples living together, 13.60% had a female householder with no husband present, and 28.00% were non-families. 25.70% of all households were made up of individuals, and 10.60% had someone living alone who was 65 years of age or older.  The average household size was 2.51 and the average family size was 3.01.

In the county, the population was spread out, with 26.20% under the age of 18, 9.70% from 18 to 24, 28.10% from 25 to 44, 23.20% from 45 to 64, and 12.80% who were 65 years of age or older.  The median age was 35 years. For every 100 females, there were 92.90 males.  For every 100 females age 18 and over, there were 88.70 males.

The median income for a household in the county was $18,294, and the median income for a family was $23,136. Males had a median income of $24,833 versus $18,390 for females. The per capita income for the county was $10,660.  About 29.60% of families and 34.80% of the population were below the poverty line, including 42.40% of those under age 18 and 28.90% of those age 65 or over.

Politics
Knox County is part of the Unionist bloc of counties covering the eastern Pennyroyal Plateau and the western part of the Eastern Coalfield. Like all counties in this bloc, Knox County is majority white by a high proportion, strongly opposed secession, and has been rock-ribbed Republican ever since the Civil War. The only Democrat to carry Knox County since then has been Lyndon Johnson during his 1964 landslide.

Education

K–12
Three public school districts serve the county:
  Knox County Public Schools serves the entire county, including the cities of Barbourville and Corbin. The following are schools funded by the Knox County Public School District (grades served in parentheses):
 Central Elementary (PS–5)
 Dewitt Elementary (PS–5)
 Flat Lick Elementary (PS–5)
 Girdler Elementary (PS–5)
 G.R. Hampton Elementary (PS–5)
 Jesse D. Lay Elementary (PS–5)
 Lynn Camp Elementary (PS–5)
 Knox County Middle School (6–8)
 Lynn Camp High School (6–12)
 Knox Appalachian School (5–12)
 Knox Central High School (9–12)
 Knox County Learning Academy (9–12)
  Barbourville Independent School District serves the city of Barbourville at a single campus with elementary and high school sections (grades PS–12).
 The Corbin Independent School District serves the entire city of Corbin, making it one of the few districts in Kentucky whose boundaries cross county lines. The following are schools funded by the Corbin Independent School School District (grades served in parentheses):
 Corbin Primary School (K–2)
 Corbin Elementary (3–4)
 Corbin Intermediate (5–6)
 Corbin Middle School (7–8)
 Corbin High School (9–12)

Higher education
Union College, a small Methodist-affiliated liberal arts college, is located in Barbourville.

Communities

Cities
 Barbourville (county seat)
 Corbin (primarily in Whitley County)

Census-designated places
 Artemus
 Flat Lick
 North Corbin (primarily in Laurel County)

Other unincorporated places
 Gray
 Kay Jay

See also

 Dry county
 National Register of Historic Places listings in Knox County, Kentucky

Notes

References
 The Kentucky Highlands Project
 Bradley, Erwin S., Union College: A History, 1889-1954, Written in Commemoration of the Seventy-Fifth Anniversary of Its Founding (Barbourville, KY: Union College, 1954). Available online at: https://archive.org/details/unioncollege18791954brad
 Decker, Elmer, "Knox County Kentucky History," manuscript by a local attorney from the 1930s and 1940s, containing much in the way of raw historical facts as well as documents, available online on the Bell County [KY] Public Libraries website www.bellcountypubliclibraries.org/crm/ky/knox/decker.html
 Fetterman, John, Stinking Creek: The Portrait of a Small Mountain Community in Appalachia (E. P. Dutton, 1967; reprint, Plume, 1970). Also available online on the Bell County [KY] Public Libraries website. See: Bellcountypubliclibraries.org
 Marigold, W. Gordon and Erwin S. Bradley, Union College, 1879-1979 (Barbourville, KY: Union College, 1979).
 Mills, Michael C., Barbourville and Knox County. Arcadia Publishing (August 2, 2000). Also available online at: Arcadia Publishing-Local Interest & American History Books
 Mitchell, Charles Reed, ed., History and Families, Knox County, Kentucky, 1799-1994. With a History of Knox County, Kentucky by William Sherman Oxendine, Charles Reed Mitchell, and Ron Rosenstiel (Paducah, KY: Turner Pub. Co., 1994).
 Warren, King Solomon, History of Knox County, Kentucky (Barbourville, KY: Daniel Boone Festival, 1976).

External links

 

 
1799 establishments in Kentucky
Counties of Appalachia
Kentucky counties
London, Kentucky micropolitan area
Populated places established in 1799